The Canterbury Hospital is a teaching hospital in  Campsie, a south-western suburb of Sydney, New South Wales, Australia.

Canterbury Hospital was opened in 1929 and was rebuilt in 1998.

Canterbury Hospital is one of many hospitals in a network under the management of Sydney Local Health District. Canterbury Hospital has links to Concord Repatriation General Hospital, Royal Prince Alfred Hospital and the University of Sydney, offering health services to residents in the Canterbury and Bankstown area of Sydney.

Canterbury Hospital and community health centre cater for a local population of 220,000 of which 66% come from non-English speaking backgrounds.

Gallery

See also
 List of hospitals in Australia

References

External links

Canterbury Hospital website

Hospitals in Sydney
Hospitals established in 1929
1929 establishments in Australia